Ocean Beach is a beach on the west coast of San Francisco, California, United States, bordering the Pacific Ocean. It is adjacent to Golden Gate Park, the Richmond District, and the Sunset District. The Great Highway runs alongside the beach, and the Cliff House and the site of the former Sutro Baths sit at the northern end. The beach is a part of the Golden Gate National Recreation Area, which is administered by the National Park Service.

During the late spring and summer, San Francisco's characteristic foggy weather frequently envelops the beach. The average temperature for the last 5 years has been  Most of the beach-friendly weather occurs in the fall (usually mid to late September) and early in the spring when fog and strong sea breezes are less prevalent. Dry winter days also tend to provide excellent weather at Ocean Beach (especially in drought years).

The water at Ocean Beach is noteworthy for its strong, dangerous currents and powerful waves, which make it popular among serious surfers. The water is cold, due in part to a process known as upwelling, in which frigid water from below the ocean surface rises to replace the surface water that moves away from the beach as a result of the Coriolis effect. The rapid rip currents, cold water, and threat of sneaker waves make the ocean dangerous for casual swimmers and even those who simply want to set foot in it, especially those without wetsuits and lifejackets, because swimmers and even waders have been swept away and drowned. The southern portion of the beach by Sloat Boulevard has some of the cleanest water in the state.

Surfing
The beach is one of the Bay Area's top surfing spots and — when breaking well — can be world class, especially during large swells in the winter months. Surfers and other swimmers have died at Ocean Beach; one example occurred in May 2006, with the next-previous death taking place in January 2006. Prior to that, it had been about five years since a death at Ocean Beach. In 1998, a record seven people lost their lives there.

The Ocean Beach surfing community is served by four surf shops and several popular beach-themed cafes. Seal Rock is a prominent local feature of the area. Third Eye Blind's Motorcycle Drive By was written about this beach.

On November 6, 2011, Ocean Beach hosted the Rip Curl Pro surfing competition, in which Kelly Slater won his 11th ASP world championship at the age of 39. This was the only one of his championships won in the continental United States.

History

Due in part to its sometimes inhospitable weather (high winds, cold weather and fog), the area was largely undeveloped throughout most of San Francisco's early history, when it was known as part of the "Outside Lands." Development finally came in the late 19th century: a steam railroad was in place by 1884 to bring people to the first amusement ride at the city's oceanside, a "Gravity Railroad" roller coaster, and to the Ocean Beach Pavilion for concerts and dancing. By 1890, trolley lines reached Ocean Beach: the Ferries and Cliff House Railroad, Park & Ocean Railroad, and Sutro Railroad that encouraged commercial amusement development as a trolley park. The Cliff House, which opened in 1863, and Sutro Baths, which opened in 1896, drew thousands of visitors.

Railroads
The Park and Ocean Railroad ran along Lincoln Way on the south edge of Golden Gate Park and then turned north into the western end of the Park along La Playa Street. This standard-gauge railway began service on December 1, 1883, using four locomotives built by Baldwin Locomotive Works in November 1880 for the Central Pacific Railroad but lettered Market Street, Park & Cliff Railroad. These four  (tank locomotives) (C/N 5357, 5357, 5375 & 5377) were joined by four  Baldwins (C/N 7201, 7203, 7238 & 7243) built in March 1884. When the line was electrified in 1900, Locomotive #1 went to the Mendocino Lumber Company, three of the s went to Canadian Collieries, and the remaining four became Southern Pacific Transportation Company numbers 20, 21, 22 and 80. Number 20 was preserved at Travel Town Museum in 1954.

The Park and Cliff House Railroad ran west along California Street and then along the coast to turn south on 48th Avenue. This  narrow-gauge railway began service in 1887 with six  Baldwins (C/N 8955, 8961, 8973, 8974, 9065 & 9073). The company was reorganized as the Ferries and Cliff House Railroad with two more  Baldwins (C/N 9756 & 9763) built in 1889. These locomotives were widely distributed during the first decade of the 20th century. One went to the Diamond and Caldor Railway, one to the Oahu Railway and Land Company, one to the San Jose and Santa Clara Electric Company, one to the Glynn and Peterson Lumber Company, and two to the Red River Lumber Company in Westwood, California.

Resort era

Following a brief stint as a refugee camp after the 1906 earthquake, the area was touted as a resort. A small amusement park, Playland at the Beach, was built where Cabrillo and Balboa streets now end. Major development occurred in the 1920s and 1930s with construction of the Great Highway and housing in the adjacent Sunset and Richmond Districts. After the destruction of the Sutro Baths in 1966, the neighborhood lost its resort appeal; the amusement park was also torn down in 1972, to be replaced by apartment blocks and a supermarket in the 1990s.

On January 25, 1878, the King Philip, a three-masted clipper ship, drifted onto Ocean Beach and foundered. From time to time, the wreckage of the ship still emerges from the sands just offshore, most recently reappearing in November 2010.

See also

49-Mile Scenic Drive
List of beaches in California
List of California state parks

References

External links
 A non commercial Ocean Beach San Francisco website including a live webcam and weather 

Beaches of San Francisco
Golden Gate National Recreation Area
Parks in San Francisco
Richmond District, San Francisco
Sunset District, San Francisco